Tak to chodí (So It Goes) is a compilation album by Czech recording artists Michal Horáček and Jarda Svoboda, released on B&M Music in 2003.

After a series of album projects recorded exclusively in collaboration with Petr Hapka, Horáček decided to release a compilation with Svoboda. Their collaboration began after Hapka turned down a number of Horáček's lyrics, which the composer "resolutely had kept refusing to set to his own music". Commercially, the final result was viewed as a failure, appearing on the Czech Albums at number #43 in 2009 and remaining there for only week. The album, however, helped promote several artists, such as Szidi Tobias and František Segrado, at that time noticed only by those involved in the music genre. In 2010, music critic Josef Vlček ranked the set as the best Czech album of the 2000s (decade).

Track listing 

Notes
 All songs performed in Czech.

Credits and personnel

 Michal Horáček - lyrics, producer
 Jarda Svoboda - music, producer, lead vocal
 František Segrado - lead vocal
 Ivana Chýlková - lead vocal
 Szidi Tobias - lead vocal

 Věra Nerušilová - lead vocal
 Milan Vyskočáni - lead vocal, producer, mix, mastering
 Jan Spálený - lead vocal, producer
 Miroslav Šibík - mix, mastering, engineer
 Michal Pekárek - engineer

Charts

References

External links 
 MichalHoráček.cz > Discography > Tak to chodí

2003 compilation albums